Chirapsina hemixantha is a moth of the family Tortricidae. It is found in India and Vietnam.

The wingspan is 30–32 mm. The ground colour of the forewings is ferruginous cream with more rust suffusions especially in terminal part of the wing. The strigulation (fine streaking) is rust coloured and the markings are pale rust with much darker, linear edges. The hindwings are cream orange.

The larvae are polyphagous.

References

Moths described in 1918
Archipini